is a Japanese anime television series set in the Bubblegum Crisis Tokyo 2040 universe.

A.D. Police began as a three-part OVA series seen as a prequel to the Bubblegum Crisis series that was called A.D. Police Files released in 1990.  Nine years later the production team decided to use the world view/ background of the original A.D. Police and fleshed it out a bit more, making an anime series consisting of 12 30-minute episodes. By updating the storyline as well as adding more updated elements of reality that have to do with the coming of the new millennium, the makers of the new A.D. Police series sought to create a series that surpassed its predecessor.

In the not-too-distant future VOOMERS (VOodoo Organic Metal Extension Resource), robots manufactured by the Genom Corporation, take care of most of the manual labor in Genom City.  Recently the VOOMERS have been malfunctioning and becoming BOOMERS, crazed robots who are often involved in many violent and criminal activities.  This is when the A.D. Police comes into play.  They are Genom City's anti-robot crime division, specially trained to deal with VOOMER-related situations.  Kenji Sasaki is one of the A.D. Police's most skilled officers.  His biggest problem is that he doesn't follow orders and his partners either end up getting killed or seriously injured.  Enter Hans Kleif, Kenji's newest partner and an amnesiac who was recently transferred to Genom City.  Together the two must overcome their differences, fight their past demons, and come together to ensure that Genom City survives the onslaught of the BOOMERS.

A.D. Police: To Protect and Serve is available in North America in a 2-disc special edition DVD from ADV Films. The original series is on DVD from Animeigo.

Background 
In 1999 Tokyo was ravaged by an enormous earthquake, leaving the city a desolate wasteland.  The government functions relocated to the surrounding suburbs, leaving the former capital to deteriorate into a slum.  Reconstruction of the area was thought impossible until a company named Genom, a corporation that made humanoid machines called VOOMERS, began to implement a plan to rebuild Tokyo in 2005.  Tokyo has been reborn as "Genom City", a metropolis completely under the control of Genom.  This resurrection did not come without a price, as overdrive accidents concerning illegal VOOMERS produced by "Packer Syndicate" have been on the rise.

Plot 
The story is based around the lives of Sasaki Kenji and Hans Kleif, two young A.D. Police Detectives who find themselves forging a bond after being forced to work together in order to stop the rogue VOOMERS from turning Genom City back into an urban wasteland.  Kenji is a loner who is known for his lack of teamwork.  It is this attitude that causes many of his previous partners to be injured or even killed.  His latest partner, Paul, was heavily injured during their last mission together and it is said that nobody is willing to work with Kenji.  He goes to his favorite bar and has a fight with a man named Hans.  When he goes to his office the next morning, he is informed that Hans is actually his new partner.

Throughout the series Kenji, Hans, and the rest of the A.D. Police Force find themselves pitted against Liam Fletcher, the series' main antagonist and a leading figure in the Packer Syndicate.  The series features different members of the police force responding to BOOMER-related situations and growing closer, not only as a unit of police officers, but as a group of friends.  The series places an extremely heavy emphasis on the growing relationship between Kenji and Hans although others, such as the romantic connection between Kenji and Kyoko, also play an important role.

Characters
Kenji Sasaki

Kenji is a lone wolf who refuses to work alongside anyone, believing that he can do anything on his own.  Recognized among the A.D. Police force due to his superior vision and reflexes, his only major falling is his tendency to put his partners into unnecessary danger.  He is the strong, silent type but begins to open up gradually thanks to his girlfriend, Kyoko, and his partner, Hans.

Hans Kleif

After an accident in which a piece of shrapnel gets embedded in his brain, Hans loses all memories of his past.  He was transferred from the regular police force in Germany and joins the A.D. Police as the resident rookie.  His great sense of humor and friendly attitude make him much easier to get along with than Kenji, and it comes as no surprise that the two do not get along well when they first meet. Slowly but surely Hans gets adapted to this new life, but he still worries about the memories he lost.

Hideaki Kurata

Kurata is a man who refuses to leave the frontlines of the war against the BOOMERS.  He has had many chances for promotion but has always refused the jobs that would take him away from the action.  He cares for his crew members, and refuses to leave their side.  His love with his ex-girlfriend, Nancy, also makes it harder for him to leave his job.

Nancy Wilson

Nancy is a beautiful and assertive New York native.  She used to date Kurata, but the couple broke up and Nancy married another.  She is recently divorced and her responsibilities as the Section Manager often seem to supersede those of a mother.  Because of her busy work life, Nancy's four-year-old daughter is often left under the care of Nancy's sister.

Jose Collins

Jose was born into the family of a rich banker, but his entire family was killed in a terrorist bombing.  Because of this experience he decided to become a bomb disposal expert.  The only member of the A.D. Police to marry and have a child, Jose has vowed to defend his new family at all costs.

Karen Jordan

Karen is the crew's expert in long-distance shooting.  She is half African-American and Japanese.  Her father abandoned her and her mother when Karen was still young, creating a wound that would fester into a deep hatred of men.  However, that hatred begins to alleviate due to her friendship with the other members of the A.D. Police.

Mary Malone

Mary was a member of the New York Police Department before joining the A.D. Police Force.  She is highly skilled and is considered to have an obsession with guns.  She also enjoys behaving like the senior officer around Hans since he is the crew's newest member.

Kyouko Miyano

Kyoko is Kenji's girlfriend, and the two met when Kenji saved her from an attacking BOOMER.  Kenji keeps his relationship a secret since he doesn't want to appear weak in front of the other members of his crew.  It is only around Kyoko that Kenji's emotions come to the surface.  She usually plays her violin for him after he is finished solving difficult cases since it brings him some measure of peace.

Cast

Additional voices 
English: Dean Turner, Hilary Haag, Jay Hickman, John Gremillion, Kelli Cousins, Kevin Charles, Mark Laskowski, Melissa Cybele, Monica Rial, Rick Peeples, Shawn Taylor, Ted Pfister, Tiffany Grant, Vic Mignogna, Victor Carsrud

Reception
Critical reception of A.D. Police: To Protect and Serve has been mixed. Anime News Network gave the series a rating of A− subbed, and B dubbed. They considered it more dark and suspenseful than A.D. Police Files, and stated that "the characters have more depth, and there are elements in the series that would glue just about anyone to the screen, whether it's the confrontation with the boomers, or just curiosity as to what's going to happen to everybody." They praised the characters for being likable, and called the series "just all-around exciting." 

Issac Cynova of THEM Anime Reviews was far more critical, as he gave the series a negative review and called it a poor-man's version of NYPD Blue. He praised the story but criticized the animation and the characters, stating that the two main leads "come off flatter than the proverbial pancake."

References

External links

 
 
A.D. Police: To Protect and Serve at Rotten Tomatoes
A.D. Police: To Protect and Serve review at DVDTown.com

To Protect and Serve
1999 anime television series debuts
ADV Films
Anime International Company
TV Tokyo original programming